In men's international ice hockey, the Big Six is a group comprising the six national teams that have dominated play throughout the history of international ice hockey, especially since the 1950s. It is composed of the North American countries of Canada and the United States and four European countries: Czech Republic, Finland, Russia, and Sweden. During the Cold War and for two years afterwards, the Soviet Union/CIS and Czechoslovakia held the places of Russia and the Czech Republic, respectively, within the group. The four European members are sometimes referred to as the "European Big Four" or "Big Four", especially to distinguish them from the North American teams.

Out of the 207 Ice Hockey World Championships medals awarded by the International Ice Hockey Federation (IIHF), 186 have been won by the Big Six teams. Since 1953, only six medals have been won by teams outside the Big Six (four by Slovakia, two by Switzerland). Of the 75 Olympic ice hockey medals awarded, 67 have been won by a Big Six team.

History

Results

Olympic Games Men's Ice Hockey Tournament

The Olympic Games were originally intended for amateur athletes.  However, the advent of the state-sponsored "full-time amateur athlete" of the Eastern Bloc countries further eroded the ideology of the pure amateur, as it put the self-financed amateurs of the Western countries at a disadvantage. The Soviet Union entered teams of athletes who were all nominally students, soldiers, or working in a profession, but many of whom were in reality paid by the state to train on a full-time basis. In 1986, the International Olympic Committee (IOC) voted to allow professional athletes to compete in the Olympic Games starting in 1988. The National Hockey League (NHL) was initially reluctant to allow its players to compete because the Olympics are held in the middle of the NHL season, and the league would have to halt play if many of its players participated. Eventually, NHL players were admitted starting in 1998. However, the NHL again refused to release its players in 2018, citing financial reasons. On September 3, 2021, NHL announced that its players will return to the Olympics and participate in 2022 tournament. Later, in December 2021, NHL and NHL Players’ Association agreed to not participate in the 2022 Winter Olympics due to COVID-19 surge.

IIHF Men's World Championships

Only the tournaments since the formation of the modern Czech Republic team are shown above. 
2020 tournament was cancelled due to the COVID-19 pandemic.

Canada Cup/World Cup of Hockey
The Canada Cup served as an ice hockey world championship that was governed by National Hockey League (NHL) rules rather than IIHF rules, and was open to professionals so that NHL players could participate. The 1976 Canada Cup was, therefore, the first time that the best players from the leading ice hockey countries were able to face each other. The tournament was held five times between 1976 and 1991. Only one team outside of the Big Six, West Germany, was ever allowed to compete in the Canada Cup; this occurred in 1984 when West Germany replaced Finland because it had finished higher in the IIHF World Championship.

The World Cup of Hockey replaced the Canada Cup in 1996. It has been held three times so far (1996, 2004, and 2016), though its future is uncertain. Eight teams compete at the World Cup: Germany and Slovakia participated in the first two editions, whereas Team Europe, made up of European players whose countries did not have their own team in the event and Team North America, composed of players 23 years old and younger from Canada and the United States, played in 2016.

Canada Cup

World Cup of Hockey

Notes

References

International Ice Hockey Federation members
National ice hockey teams